The 2015 Clare Senior Football Championship was the 120th staging of the Clare Senior Football Championship since its establishment by the Clare County Board in 1887.

The defending champions and holders of the Jack Daly Cup were Cratloe who successfully defended their maiden title won in 2013. Having defeated Crusheen in the senior hurling final seven days earlier, they completed a historic first Clare Senior Championship 'Double' since Ennis Dalcassians in 1929, defeating Éire Óg, Ennis in the 2014 county football final.

Senior Championship Fixtures/Results

First round
 Eight winners advance to Round 2A (winners)
 Eight losers move to Round 2B (Losers)

Second round

A. Winners
 Played by eight winners of Round 1
 Four winners advance to Quarter-finals
 Four losers move to Round 3

B. Losers
 Played by eight losers of Round 1
 Four winners move to Round 3

Third round
 Played by four losers of Round 2A & four winners of Round 2B
 Four winners advance to Quarter-finals

Quarter-finals
 Played by four winners of Round 2A and four winners of Round 3

Semi-finals

County final

Championship statistics

Miscellaneous
 St. Joseph's, Miltown Malbay win their first title since 1990.
 Cooraclare qualify for the final for the first time since 1997.

References

External links

Clare Senior Football Championship
Clare Senior Football Championship